Sebastián César Helios Ribas Barbato (born 11 March 1988) is an Uruguayan footballer who plays as a forward for Montevideo City.

Career

Early career
Born in Montevideo, Ribas began made his debuts as a senior with Juventud de Las Piedras, appearing in 17 matches and scoring six goals during his first season.

Internazionale
Ribas signed with Inter Milan for an undisclosed fee in the 2006 summer. He made his first appearance for the club in the quarter final of Coppa Italia in the second leg in a 2–0 win over Empoli on 17 January 2007.

Ribas scored his first domestic goal for Inter Milan against Atalanta in the Coppa Italia. With his first team opportunities limited, he joined Spezia, also appearing rarely.

Dijon
Ribas signed Dijon FCO in the summer of 2008 on a three-year contract. In the opening game of the season, Ribas made his debut in a 3–1 loss against Lens. However, in his debut, he received a red card after picking up yellow twice. Few weeks after making his debut on 22 August 2008, Ribas scored a winning goal in a 2–1 win over Tours and on 10 April 2009, he scored his first brace of his career in a 2–1 win over Brest. In his first season, Ribas made 39 appearances and scored nine. At Dijon, Ribas would become an influential player in the club.

The following season, Ribas improved the club when he began a scoring form, resulting scoring sixteen and was the third top-scorer, just behind Anthony Modeste and Olivier Giroud. During the season, Ribas scored his first hat-trick of his Dijon career in a 5–4 goal thriller win over Châteauroux on 30 October 2009, including a winning goal when he scored from a penalty and set up a goal for Christophe Mandanne.

At the end of the year, Ribas was chosen the best player from Ligue 2 in 2010, scoring 25 goals in that year. After scoring a hat-trick in a 3–2 win over Le Mans on 5 March 2011, he put his tally to 15 goals in 26 matches in the current season of Ligue 2, being the current leader of goalscorers and at the end of the season, Ribas scored 23 goals, making him the league's top scorer and the club was promoted to the Ligue 1. Earlier in the season, Ribas scored his first hat-trick of the season in a 5–1 win over Evian on 17 September 2011. At the end of the season, the club announced it negotiations to keep Ribas at the club for another three years and even with his wages increased. However, Ribas rejected a new contract at Dijon. Manager Patrice Carteron was disappointed with Ribas contract been rejected and said in his statement:"But we can not align it could affect elsewhere. Sebastian goes, but death in the soul. And we, too, are necessarily very sad,"

Genoa
Ribas joined Serie A side Genoa on 6 July 2011. However, his time at Genoa was forgettable over his lack of playing time and barely being used on the bench (although he was in the bench twice earlier in the season). Ribas had also struggled to settle in Italy, though, and has already found himself out of favour and was linked back to Dijon, which was denied by Carteron.

Loan spells
On 4 January 2012 Ribas joined Sporting CP in a one and a half year loan deal. On 15 January 2012, he made his debut in a 2–1 loss against Braga. Shortly after joining Sporting Lisbon, he would receive playing time in the starting eleven. However under new manager Ricardo Sá Pinto, he would soon fell out of favor with Pinto and was replaced by youngster Diego Rubio. At the end of the season, Ribas loan spell at Lisbon ended.

Ribas transferred to Ligue 2 side AS Monaco on 16 July 2012 in a loan deal, having left France two years earlier. Earlier of the season, Ribas had yet to play his first match. This led Manager Claudio Ranieri says on Ribas stating he "still needs at least one month to be competitive" However, Ribas made no appearances, due to an ongoing injury and returned to Genoa.

On 21 July 2013, he was loaned to Barcelona Sporting Club of Guayaquil. Ribas returns to South America to play for one year with an option for the club to purchase him from Genoa. He returned in January 2014 to Genoa C.F.C., which loaned him on 31 January 2014 for the remainder season to Championnat National club RC Strasbourg.

Venados
On 3 July 2016, Ribas joined Mexican club Venados.

Personal life
Sebastián Ribas is the son of former Peñarol and Venezia head coach Julio César Ribas, and also has an Italian passport due to his mother, born in Palermo, Italy.

Career statistics

Honours
Inter Primavera
Torneo di Viareggio: 2006
Individual
Ligue 2 Player of the Year: 2010–11
Ligue 2 Top scorer: 2010–11

References

External links
 
 

1988 births
Living people
Footballers from Montevideo
Uruguayan footballers
Uruguayan sportspeople of Italian descent
Association football forwards
Uruguayan expatriate footballers
Expatriate footballers in Mexico
Uruguayan expatriate sportspeople in Mexico
Expatriate footballers in Italy
Uruguayan expatriate sportspeople in Italy
Expatriate footballers in France
Uruguayan expatriate sportspeople in France
Expatriate footballers in Portugal
Uruguayan expatriate sportspeople in Portugal
Expatriate footballers in Ecuador
Uruguayan expatriate sportspeople in Ecuador
Uruguayan expatriate sportspeople in Monaco
Expatriate footballers in Monaco
Uruguayan expatriate sportspeople in Spain
Expatriate footballers in Spain
Uruguayan Primera División players
Serie B players
Ligue 2 players
Ecuadorian Serie A players
Segunda División B players
Primeira Liga players
Argentine Primera División players
Juventud de Las Piedras players
Inter Milan players
Spezia Calcio players
Genoa C.F.C. players
Dijon FCO players
Club Atlético River Plate (Montevideo) players
Sporting CP footballers
Barcelona S.C. footballers
AS Monaco FC players
RC Strasbourg Alsace players
FC Cartagena footballers
Venados F.C. players
FC Karpaty Lviv players
Centro Atlético Fénix players
Club Atlético Lanús footballers
Rosario Central footballers
Central Córdoba de Santiago del Estero footballers
Montevideo City Torque players
Club Atlético Patronato footballers
Uruguayan expatriate sportspeople in Argentina
Uruguayan expatriate sportspeople in Ukraine
Expatriate footballers in Ukraine
Expatriate footballers in Argentina